Chloro(cyclopentadienyl)bis(triphenylphosphine)ruthenium is the organoruthenium half-sandwich compound with formula RuCl(PPh3)2(C5H5).  It as an air-stable orange crystalline solid that is used in a variety of organometallic synthetic and catalytic transformations.  The compound has idealized Cs symmetry.  It is soluble in chloroform, dichloromethane, and acetone.

Preparation
Chloro(cyclopentadienyl)bis(triphenylphosphine)ruthenium was first reported in 1969 when it was prepared by reacting dichlorotris(triphenylphosphine)ruthenium(II) with cyclopentadiene.

RuCl2(PPh3)3 + C5H6  →   RuCl(PPh3)3(C5H5) + HCl

It is prepared by heating a mixture of ruthenium(III) chloride, triphenylphosphine, and cyclopentadiene in ethanol.

Reactions
Chloro(cyclopentadienyl)bis(triphenylphosphine)ruthenium(II)  undergoes a variety of reactions often by involving substitution of the chloride.  With phenylacetylene it gives the phenyl vinylidene complex:
 (C5H5)(PPh3)2RuCl + HC2Ph + NH4[PF6]  →  [Ru(C:CHPh)(PPh3)2(C5H5)][PF6] + NH4Cl

Displacement of one PPh3 by carbon monoxide affords a chiral compound.

(C5H5)(PPh3)2RuCl  +  CO   →   (C5H5)(PPh3)(CO)RuCl  +  PPh3

The compound can also be converted into the hydride:
(C5H5)(PPh3)2RuCl + NaOMe   →   (C5H5)(PPh3)2RuH + NaCl + CH2O

A related complex is tris(acetonitrile)cyclopentadienylruthenium hexafluorophosphate, which has three labile MeCN ligands.

Applications
Chloro(cyclopentadienyl)bis(triphenylphosphine)ruthenium(II) serves as a catalyst for a variety of specialized reactions.  For example, in the presence of NH4PF6 it catalyzes the isomerisation of allylic alcohols to the corresponding saturated carbonyls.

References

Organoruthenium compounds
Triphenylphosphine complexes
Cyclopentadienyl complexes
Chloro complexes
Ruthenium(II) compounds